JKS may refer to:

 J. K. Simmons (born 1955), American actor
 James Kenneth Stephen (1859–1892), English poet and tutor to Prince Albert Victor
 Japan Karate Shoto Federation, a karate association founded by Tetsuhiko Asai
 Jatiya Krishak Samity, a farmers organization in Bangladesh
 Java KeyStore, a repository of security certificates
 JKS (director), an Indian film director
 The Journal of Korean Studies, a biannual peer-reviewed academic journal covering Korean studies
 Makoto Saitō (wrestler) (born 1974; also Jimmy K-ness J.K.S.), a Japanese professional wrestler for Dragon Gate